Centre Presbyterian Church, Session House and Cemeteries is a historic Presbyterian church, session house, and cemetery located near Mount Mourne, Iredell County, North Carolina (Mooresville, North Carolina).  The original church building was constructed in 1765, but was destroyed by fire. The current church building and session house were constructed 1854. The church is a one-story, three bay by four bay, rectangular vernacular Greek Revival style brick church.  The church's cemetery contains gravestones dating to the 18th century.

It was added to the National Register of Historic Places in 1980.

Gallery

References

External links

Official Church Website

Presbyterian churches in North Carolina
Churches on the National Register of Historic Places in North Carolina
Churches completed in 1854
19th-century Presbyterian church buildings in the United States
Cemeteries in North Carolina
Churches in Iredell County, North Carolina
National Register of Historic Places in Iredell County, North Carolina
1765 establishments in the British Empire